Joy Xuan Deng (born 20 January 1992) is a Hong Kong badminton player. She started playing badminton in her hometown Guangzhou, and in 2010, Deng was selected to join the China national badminton team. In 2014, she retired from the China national badminton team, and in 2017, she started to represent Hong Kong.

Achievements

Youth Olympic Games 
Girls' singles

Asian Junior Championships 
Girls' singles

BWF World Tour 
The BWF World Tour, which was announced on 19 March 2017 and implemented in 2018, is a series of elite badminton tournaments sanctioned by the Badminton World Federation (BWF). The BWF World Tour is divided into levels of World Tour Finals, Super 1000, Super 750, Super 500, Super 300 (part of the HSBC World Tour), and the BWF Tour Super 100.

Women's singles

BWF Grand Prix 
The BWF Grand Prix has two levels: Grand Prix and Grand Prix Gold. It is a series of badminton tournaments, sanctioned by Badminton World Federation (BWF) since 2007.

Women's singles

  BWF Grand Prix Gold tournament
  BWF Grand Prix tournament

BWF International Challenge/Series 
Women's singles

  BWF International Challenge tournament
  BWF International Series tournament
  BWF Future Series tournament

References

External links 
 
 
 
 

1992 births
Living people
Badminton players from Guangzhou
Chinese female badminton players
Hong Kong female badminton players
Badminton players at the 2010 Summer Youth Olympics